Ouled Antar District is a district of Médéa Province, Algeria.

The district is further divided into 3 municipalities:
Ouled Antar
Boghar
Ouled Hellal

Districts of Médéa Province